Ambivina is a fungal genus in the family Corticiaceae. It is a monotypic genus, containing the single species Ambivina filobasidia, described by B. Katz in 1974.

References

Corticiales
Monotypic Basidiomycota genera